Khvajeh Kari (also Romanized as Khvājeh Karī) is a village in Khotbeh Sara Rural District, Kargan Rud District, Talesh County, Gilan Province, Iran. At the 2006 census, its population was 631, in 177 families.

References 

Populated places in Talesh County